Alice is a small town in Eastern Cape, South Africa that is named after Princess Alice, the daughter of the British Queen Victoria. It was settled in 1824 by British colonists it's adjacent to the Tyhume River. It has rail and road connection to East London, King William's Town and other towns in the province.

University of Fort Hare
The University of Fort Hare began in early 1847 as a fort built to house British troops. The same fort was converted in 1916 into a black university institution. Many of the current political leaders in South Africa were educated at the University of Fort Hare. It is also the alma mater of former President Nelson Mandela. The university is also the repository of the archives of the African National Congress and documents and houses one of the most significant collections of African art.

Victoria Hospital
Built in 1898.One of the oldest sites in Alice, it still graces the town with its old charm of yesterday. Victoria Hospital is a large district hospital on the outskirts of Alice, recently (2006–2011) fully reconstructed and upgraded by the Eastern Cape Provincial Government.

History

The location was named Lovedale by European missionaries who settled there in 1824.It lies on the southwestern bank of the Tyhume River, west-northwest of East London, at an elevation of 1,720(524m).It was named after John Love of the Glasgow Missionary Society. During the Frontier War it was abandoned and the mission resettled on the west bank of the Tyhume River. On the east bank a fort was built, called Fort Hare, after Major-General John Hare, who was Lieutenant-Governor of the Eastern Cape and acting Governor of the Cape Colony. Later the name of the town was changed to Alice. Alice was the administrative and magisterial capital of the old district of Victoria East. In 1847, it was named Alice by Sir Peregrine Maitland after Princess Alice, the second  daughter of Queen Victoria. Municipal status was attained in 1852. The town is now a thriving university town and has received major infrastructure upgrades under the current Mayor Bandile Khethelo.

Notable locals 
Cecilia Makiwane, first black nurse
Naledi Pandor, politician
Ngconde Balfour, politician
Makhenkesi Stofile, politician
Sipho Burns-Ncamashe, politician
Looksmart Ngudle, anti apartheid activist
John Tengo Jabavu, poet/writer
John Knox Bokwe, writer/author
ZK Matthews, university teacher
Thandatha Jongilizwe Mabandla
Chief Mqalo
Jerry Nqolo, cricket player

References

Populated places in the Raymond Mhlaba Local Municipality